The SOS Hermann Gmeiner Technical School (格迈纳尔 职业 技术学校 gé-mài-nà-ěr zhí-yè jì-shù- xué-xiào) is situated in Qiqihar, a city in Heilongjiang province, in the Northeast of China. Since its founding in 1996 the school focuses on two main learning fields: on the one hand on natural science and practical learning contents such as handcraft, on the other hand on language-teaching, especially on English lessons. It is named after Austrian philanthropist Hermann Gmeiner. 

It is a vocational school according to the Western model. But its pedagogical principle places emphasis on social values because the school is connected to the local SOS Children's Village whose inhabitants have the possibility of free education.

See also
Austrian Service Abroad
Austrian Social Service

External links
Austrian community service at Hermann Gmeiner Vocational School
SOS Children's Village Qiqihar (English)
SOS Children's Village Qiqihar, China (Chinese)

Educational institutions established in 1996
Schools in Heilongjiang
1996 establishments in China